Thomas Gale (4 November 1920 – 29 January 1975) was an English footballer who played for Sheffield Wednesday and York City in the Football League.

Career
Born in Washington, County Durham, Gale played for Gateshead as an amateur before joining Sheffield Wednesday in the Football League in April 1945. He made six league appearances for Wednesday before joining York City in August 1947. He was captain for two seasons, and after making 80 appearances he signed for Scarborough in June 1949.

References

1920 births
People from Washington, Tyne and Wear
Footballers from Tyne and Wear
1975 deaths
English footballers
Association football defenders
Gateshead F.C. players
Sheffield Wednesday F.C. players
York City F.C. players
Scarborough F.C. players
English Football League players